| tries = {{#expr:
 3 + 7 + 3 + 3 + 5 + 8
 + 4 + 8 + 13 + 8 + 11 + 7 
 + 3 + 0 + 4 + 0 + 2 + 14
 + 6 + 3 + 9 + 2 + 2 + 8
 + 9 + 1 + 2 + 4 + 7 + 10
 + 5 + 12 + 9 + 3 + 7 + 6
 + 2 + 5 + 4 + 0 + 9 + 3
 + 5 + 3 + 7 + 2 + 4 + 8
 + 3 + 3 + 5 + 9 + 14 + 8
 + 8 + 9 + 5 + 8 + 5 + 4
 + 11 + 4 + 7 + 5 + 10 + 12
 + 5 + 6 + 6 + 5 + 6 
 + 9 + 2 + 8 + 8 + 7 + 7
 + 9
 + 3 + 2 + 5 + 5 + 5 + 15
 + 8 + 5 + 7 
 
 
 
 
 
 

}}
| top point scorer   =  Louis Grimoldby(Ampthill) Rory Jennings(Coventry) Sam Olver(Doncaster Knights)112 points each
| top try scorer     =  George McGuigan(Newcastle Falcons) Adam Radwan(Newcastle Falcons)10 tries each
| prevseason         = 2018–19
| nextseason         = 2020–21
}}

The 2019–20 RFU Championship, known as the 2019–20 Greene King IPA Championship for sponsorship reasons, was the eleventh season of the RFU Championship, the professional second tier of rugby union in England. It featured eleven English teams and one from Jersey. The competition was sponsored by Greene King for the seventh successive season.

Due to the COVID-19 pandemic in the United Kingdom, the Rugby Football Union officially cancelled the season on 20 March 2020, after initially postponing all rugby in England including training from 17 March until 14 April 2020. As a result, Newcastle Falcons were declared champions for the season, and promoted to the Premiership on 2 April 2020 on the basis of a best playing record formula, having been undefeated and top of the table when the league was suspended, while Yorkshire Carnegie were relegated to National League 1 at the bottom.

Structure 
The team that finished first was promoted to Premiership Rugby as their ground met the RFU Minimum Standards Criteria. The team that finished last was relegated to National League 1. Each club will received £530,000 in funding from the RFU in the last year of a deal with the RFU.

Plans to expand Premiership Rugby from 12 to 13 teams for the 2019-20 season, which would have reprieved Newcastle Falcons from being relegated to the Championship, were blocked by the RFU. Plans to abolish promotion and relegation were under discussion prior to the season, and drew complaints and threats of legal action from the Cornish Pirates. There were also plans for the RFU Championship to have a delayed start until October due to the 2019 Rugby World Cup.

The season began on 20 September 2019 with the Championship Rugby Cup after which the first round of matches started on 11 October 2019 and the final round of matches were scheduled to be played on 9 May 2020.

Teams 
Richmond were relegated to National League 1 after finishing bottom of the 2018-19 RFU Championship. They are replaced by Ampthill who were promoted from 2018-19 National League 1 in their fifth promotion in twelve years, playing in the Championship for the first time. London Irish were promoted back to Premiership Rugby at the first attempt. They are replaced in the RFU Championship by Newcastle Falcons who were relegated after finishing last in 2018-19 Premiership Rugby.

Tables

At the date the Championship was suspended, the Championship table read as follows:

On 4 April, the Rugby Football Union confirmed the final table for the season.

Fixtures & Results

Round 1

Round 2

Round 3

Round 4

Round 5

Round 6

Round 7

Round 8

Round 9

Round 10

Round 11

Round 12 

Game postponed due to bad weather (storm).  Game to be rescheduled to 22 February 2020.

Round 13

Round 12 (rescheduled game) 

Game rescheduled from 9 February 2020.

Round 14

Round 15 

Cancelled due to coronavirus outbreak.

Cancelled due to coronavirus outbreak.

Cancelled due to coronavirus outbreak.

Attendances

Individual statistics
 Note that points scorers includes tries as well as conversions, penalties and drop goals. Appearance figures also include coming on as substitutes (unused substitutes not included).

Top points scorers

Top try scorers

Season records

Team
Largest home win — 52 points (2)
52 – 0 Cornish Pirates at home to Yorkshire Carnegie on 12 January 2020
55 – 3 Coventry at home to Yorkshire Carnegie on 15 February 2020
Largest away win — 53 points
66 – 13 Ealing Trailfinders away to Yorkshire Carnegie on 10 November 2019
Most points scored — 77 points
77 – 26 Ealing Trailfinders at home to Ampthill on 18 January 2020
Most tries in a match — 11 (2)
Ealing Trailfinders at home to Ampthill on 18 January 2020
London Scottish away to Yorkshire Carnegie on 1 March 2020
Most conversions in a match — 10
Ealing Trailfinders at home to Ampthill on 18 January 2020
Most penalties in a match — 5 (2)
Coventry away to Jersey Reds on 12 October 2019
Doncaster Knights at home to Bedford Blues on 2 November 2019
Most drop goals in a match — 0

Attendances
Highest — 6,315
Newcastle Falcons at home to Cornish Pirates on 16 February 2020
Lowest — 300
Yorkshire Carnegie at home to Ampthill on 22 February 2020
Highest average attendance — 4,707	
Newcastle Falcons
Lowest average attendance — 776	
Yorkshire Carnegie

Player
Most points in a match — 25
 Jack Spittle for Nottingham away to Yorkshire Carnegie on 31 January 2020
Most tries in a match — 5 
 Jack Spittle for Nottingham away to Yorkshire Carnegie on 31 January 2020
Most conversions in a match — 8
 Harry Sheppard for London Scottish away to Yorkshire Carnegie on 1 March 2020
Most penalties in a match — 5 (2)
 Rory Jennings for Coventry away to Jersey Reds on 12 October 2019
 Sam Olver for Doncaster Knights at home to Bedford Blues on 2 November 2019
Most drop goals in a match — 0

Notes

References 

 
RFU Championship seasons
2019–20 in English rugby union leagues
RFU Championship